Notosphaeridion is a genus of beetles in the family Cerambycidae, containing the following species:

 Notosphaeridion brevithorax (Martins, 1960)
 Notosphaeridion scabrosum (Gounelle, 1909)
 Notosphaeridion umbrinum Martins, 1971
 Notosphaeridion vestitum Martins, 1960

References

Ibidionini